The 3rd Marine Artillery Regiment is the heir to the 3rd Marine Artillery Regiment created in Rochefort by Napoleon Bonaparte's consular decree of May 13, 1803, the 3rd Colonial Artillery Regiment, then the 3rd Marine Artillery Regiment. The 3e RAMa has been present in either a constituted corps or isolated unit since 1803, on almost all the battlefields in which France has been engaged. The regiment was founded in a third operational phase in 1943.

Creation and different nominations 

 On December 1, 1902 : 3rd Colonial Artillery Regiment at Toulon. 
 On January 1, 1924 : 310th Colonial Artillery Portable Regiment.
 On May 5, 1929 : 3rd Colonial Artillery Regiment, Joigny, 2nd formation.
 On December 1, 1932: the regiment was designated as the 3rd Divisionary Hippomobile Colonial Artillery Regiment.
 In June 1940 : disappeared, the regiment was dissolved.
 In July 1943 : 3rd Colonial Artillery Regiment, 3rd formation from artillery batteries present in Africa. 
 In November 1943 : I/3rd Colonial Artillery Regiment.
 On October 1, 1945 : Divisionary Automative Artillery Group of the 2nd Armored Division 2e DB, Vernon. 
 On July 1, 1960 : I/ 3rd Marine Artillery Regiment, artillery regiment of the 10th Armored Division 10e DB, at Verdun, until 1991. 
 On July 1, 1994 : Canjuers

History since 1813

World War II 

On May 10, 1940, the 3rd Colonial Infantry Divisionary Regiment was part of the 3rd Colonial Infantry Division.

The 3rd Colonial Division included the 1st Colonial Infantry Regiment (1er RIC), 21st Colonial Infantry Regiment (21e RIC), 23rd Colonial Infantry Regiment, the 3rd Colonial Artillery Regiment (3e RAC), 203rd Colonial Artillery Regiment (203e RAC). The 3rd Colonial Infantry Division disappeared.

Reconstituted progressively from individuals rallying to général de Gaulle since August 1940, the regiment participated to operations of column Leclerc, then integrated the 2nd Armored Division of général Leclerc.

Post War 

 Divisionary Automative Artillery Group of 2nd Armoured (Vernon since October 1, 1945)
 I/3e Marine Artillery Regiment July 1, 1960, the artillery regiment of the 10th Armoured Division at Verdun until July 1, 1984.
 The regiment participated in two tours in Bosnia with UNPROFOR.
 Artillery Regiment of the 6th Light Armoured Brigade (3rd Division) since July 1, 1999.

Campaigns

Organization
The 3e RAMa is composed of 950 artillery marines articulated in 6 Artillery batteries:

 1 command and logistics artillery battery 
 2 ground composed artillery batteries equipped with 155mm CAESAR and 120mm type mortars
 1 Ground-to-Air artillery battery with missiles 
 1 artillery renseignement brigade battery 
 1 artillery intervention reserve battery.

Part of Equipment 
 120 mm type mortars
 VAB equipped with mortars and 20mm type cannons 
 CAESAR

Traditions

Insignia

Regimental Colors

Regimental Song

Decorations 

The Regimental Colors of the 3rd Marine Artillery Regiment 3e RAMa is decorated with:

 Croix de guerre 1914-1918 with:
 2 palms (two citations at the orders of the armed forces) 
 Croix de guerre 1939-1945 with:
2 palms (two citations at the orders of the armed forces).
 Fourragere with:
 colors of the croix de guerre 1914-1918 awarded on January 31, 1919 with olive color bearing the attribution of the croix de guerre 1914-1918, then the olive color bearing the attribution of croix de guerre 1939-1945 awarded September 18, 1946
 U.S. Presidential Unit Citation
 Fourragere with :
 colors of Cross of the Liberation
 Croix de la Valeur militaire with :
 1 vermeil star (September 2013)

Honours

Battle Honours
 Hanau 1813
 Mogador 1844
 Dahomey 1892
 Tien-Tsin 1900
 Maroc 1908-1913
 Champagne 1915
 Somme 1916
 La Serre 1918
 Fezzan 1942
 Sud Tunisien 1943
 Paris 1944
 Strasbourg 1944

Regimental Commanders 
3rd Marine Artillery Regiment, 3e RAMa

See also
Moroccan Division
35th Parachute Artillery Regiment

Sources and bibliography

 Erwan Bergot, La coloniale du Rif au Tchad 1925-1980, imprimé en France : décembre 1982, n° d'éditeur 7576, n° d'imprimeur 31129, sur les presses de l'imprimerie Hérissey.

Artillery,03
Companions of the Liberation
Marine,03
20th-century regiments of France
21st-century regiments of France
Military units and formations established in 1803
Military units and formations disestablished in 1943